The Lugii (or Lugi, Lygii, Ligii, Lugiones, Lygians, Ligians, Lugians, or Lougoi) were a large tribal confederation mentioned by Roman authors living in ca. 100 BC–300 AD in Central Europe, north of the Sudetes mountains in the basin of upper Oder and Vistula rivers, covering most of modern southern and middle Poland (regions of Silesia, Greater Poland, Mazovia and Lesser Poland). 

Most archaeologists identify the Lugians with the Przeworsk culture, which is also associated with the Vandals, and it has been suggested that the Lugians and Vandals may have been closely related or even the same. While this culture was strongly Celtic-influenced in early Roman times, the Lugii are also sometimes regarded as Germanic like the Vandals. 

They played an important role on the middle part of the Amber Road from Sambia at the Baltic Sea to the provinces of Roman Empire: Pannonia, Noricum and Raetia. Lugii should not be confused with a tribe of the same name, usually spelled as Lugi, that inhabited the southern part of Sutherland in Scotland. The Lugii have been identified by many modern historians as the same people as the Vandals, with whom they must certainly have been strongly linked during Roman times.

Etymology 
The etymology of the name Lugii is uncertain. It could be related to the Celtic root *leug- ('swamp'), *lugiyo- ('oath'; cf. Gaulish luge, 'by the oath', OIr. luige 'oath'), *lugo- ('black', cf. Ir. loch), or possibly to the name of the god Lug.

History
The Lugii are first mentioned in Strabo's Geographica. He writes that the Lugians were "a great people" and—together with other peoples like Semnones, Lombards and the otherwise unknown Zumi, Butones, Mugilones and Sibini—were part of a federation subjected to the rule of Maroboduus, ruler of the Marcomanni with their centre in modern Bohemia 9 BC–19 AD. In 19 AD Maroboduus was overthrown with the help of Arminius of the Cherusci.

The Lugii are not mentioned at all by Pliny the Elder, who instead mentions the Vandilii living in the same area as one of the most important peoples of Germania, including the tribes Burgundiones, Varines, Charines and Gutones.

The next mention of Lugii are the times of the Roman emperor Claudius (41–54). According to Tacitus's Annales, in 50 'a great multitude' of Lugians and Hermunduri, led by the Hermundurian Vibilius, took part in the fall of Vannius, who the Romans had imposed as a ruler to replace Maroboduus. In the book Germania (43:3), Tacitus mentions the name Vandilii as a "genuine and ancient name", but does not mention the Vandilii in the list of peoples at all. Tacitus however describes the Lugii, writing that they were divided into many tribes ('civitates'), of which he mentions the five most powerful: Harii, Helveconae, Manimi, Helisii and Nahanarvali. 

The next information about the Lugians comes from Cassius Dio's work Roman History, in which he mentions events of 91–92 during the reign of emperor Domitian. The Lugii allied themselves with the Romans and asked them for help against some of the Suebi. Domitian sent 100 horsemen to support the Lugians. It is not known if these horsemen really arrived at their destination; if they did, it would be the first recorded presence of Roman soldiers on what is now Poland. The 12th century Chronica Polonorum by Wincenty Kadlubek mentions the alliance between the Lugii and the Romans.

Ptolemy mentions the Lugi Omani (Λοῦγοι οἱ Ὀμανοί), the Lugi Diduni (Λοῦγοι οἱ Διδοῦνοι) and the Lugi Buri (Λοῦγοι οἱ Βοῦροι) located on or near the upper Vistula in Germania Magna in what is now south Poland (Book 2, Chapter 10, 4th map of Europe). Ptolemy does not mention the Vandals at all. The Buri, who according to Ptolemy were part of the Lugians, (Tacitus treated them separately, and as Suebian in language) took an important role during the Marcomannic Wars (166–180): the Romans were forced to organize a separate military campaign against them called 'Expeditio Burica' in 182-183 during the reign of emperor Commodus.

The later history of the Lugians is uncertain, but some historians assume that the Lugians can be identified with the 'Longiones' tribe mentioned in Zosimus's New History (Historia Nova), as being defeated by the Emperor Probus in year 279 in the province of Raetia near the Lygis river (usually identified with Lech river in modern Austria and Bavaria). Another mention might be a great people of 'Lupiones-Sarmatae' shown on the Latin map Tabula Peutingeriana generally dated to 2nd-4th century AD.

The Lugii were probably completely absorbed into the Vandals by the 3rd century. While the two peoples are located by Roman authors as living in the same region, they are never mentioned simultaneously. According to John Anderson, the "Lugii and Vandilii are designations of the same tribal group, the latter an extended ethnic name, the former probably a cult-title." Herwig Wolfram notes that "In all likelihood the Lugians and the Vandals were one cultic community that lived in the same region of the Oder in Silesia, where it was first under Celtic and then under Germanic domination."

Notes

Sources

Primary sources
Tacitus, Germania XLIII

Secondary sources

 
Early Germanic peoples
Prehistoric Poland
Vandals